: may refer to:

 Suzuki Inazuma 250, a motorcycle
 , four destroyers of the Imperial Japanese Navy and the Japan Maritime Self-Defense Force
 Lightning (1952 film), or Inazuma, a Japanese film by Mikio Naruse
 Inazuma, an Usagi Yojimbo character
 Inazuma Eleven, an association-football-themed media franchise
 Inazuma, a region in Genshin Impact''

People with the surname
 Inazuma Raigorō (1802–1877), Japanese sumo wrestler

See also 
 Lightning (disambiguation)
 Ikazuchi (disambiguation)
 Raiden (disambiguation)
 Azuma (disambiguation)